Robert Munic  is an American producer, writer, director and occasional actor. He is a director and the writer/co-executive producer of the television series Empire.

Selected production credits

Selected acting credits

References

1968 births
Living people
American male screenwriters
American male television actors
American television directors
American television producers